Konstantin Vyacheslavovich Ledovskikh (born 12 July 1972) is a Kazakhstani professional football coach and a former player.

Club career
He made his professional debut in the Soviet Second League in 1989 for FC Shakhter Karagandy.

Honours
 Ukrainian Premier League 3rd place: 1995.

References

1972 births
Sportspeople from Karaganda
Living people
Soviet footballers
Kazakhstani footballers
Association football goalkeepers
Kazakhstan international footballers
FC Shakhter Karagandy players
FC Ural Yekaterinburg players
FC Dnipro players
FC Metalurh Novomoskovsk players
FC Arsenal Tula players
FC Zhemchuzhina Sochi players
FC Volgar Astrakhan players
FC Okean Nakhodka players
FC Okzhetpes players
Russian Premier League players
Ukrainian Premier League players
Kazakhstan Premier League players
Kazakhstani expatriate footballers
Expatriate footballers in Ukraine
Kazakhstani expatriate sportspeople in Ukraine
Expatriate footballers in Russia
Expatriate footballers in Spain
FC Spartak Nizhny Novgorod players